Talawakelle is a town in Nuwara Eliya District in the Central Province, Sri Lanka, governed by an Urban Council. It is the center of Dimbula tea planting district, the largest tea growing area in Sri Lanka. It is situated on A7 Colombo-Nuwara Eliya highway. Talawakelle railway station is one of the major stops of Udarata (Sinhala "Hill Country") or Main railway line. The town is administrated by Talawakelle-Lindula urban council.

Located in the Colombo-Badulla railway line, and Avissawella - Nuware Eliya main Road (A7) the town serves as a gateway to Tea Research Institute of Sri Lanka, Nuwara Eliya and tourists.

Climate
The mean annual temperature is around 18°C in the area and this climate is described as the perfect "tea-climate".

Demography
Majority of the population of Talawakelle is Indian Tamils who are workers of neighboring tea estates. The town considered the focal point of Indian Tamil politics in Sri Lanka. Small portion of Sinhalese also live in  the town.

Main schools
Schools in Talawakelle are part of the Nuwara-Eliya school district.
 Talawakelle Tamil Maha Vidyalayam - Tamil Medium
 Sumana Secondary School is a provincial school for grades 6 through 13. It has an Advanced Science track.  Instruction is done in both Sinhala and English.
 St. Patrick's College, Talawakelle - Tamil Medium

Visitor attractions
There are two waterfalls situated around Talawakelle area. Both the waterfalls formed by Kothmale Oya, which runs through the town.
Devon Falls
St. Clair's Falls

Post and telephone
 Sri Lanka 00 94
 Area code 052
 Postal code 22100

Upper Kothmale Project 
The last major hydro-electricity project in Sri Lanka, Upper Kotmale Dam, is currently underway near the town of Talawakelle. The project drew many a protests from environmentalists and local residents. Owing to threatened existence of St. Clair's Falls and fear of losing or submerging their homes to the dam.

Notes

References
 

Populated places in Nuwara Eliya District